The Society for Electro-Acoustic Music in the United States (SEAMUS) is a nonprofit US-based organization founded in 1984 that aims to promote the performance and creation of electro-acoustic music in the United States. In particular, the organization aims:
To encourage the composition, performance of, and research about electro-acoustic music in the United States
To foster a network for technical and artistic information exchange
To attract a wide diversity of members (i.e., practitioners of a diversity of experimental practices and practitioners manifesting a diversity of racial and gender identities and ages) from both in and outside of academic institutions
To seek to remove structural and economic barriers to the creation, performance, documentation, and dissemination of electro-acoustic music
To share SEAMUS activities with members, and with the larger artistic and academic communities

SEAMUS comprises composers, performers, and teachers of electroacoustic music representing every part of the United States and is known for its annual conference, which provides a venue for the presentation and performance of electro-acoustic music from around the world. The organization was formed in 1984 as a U.S. chapter of the International Confederation of Electroacoustic Music (ICEM) which had been formed 2 years prior in Bourges, France. The U.S. representative to ICEM, Jon Appleton, suggested to composer Barry Schrader the formation of such a chapter in 1983 and the inaugural meeting was held at the California Institute of the Arts in November 1984. Significant supporters have included  CalArts, ASCAP, and The Alexander Family Foundation.

Current board of directors 
President: Elizabeth Hoffman
Vice President of Programs: Annie Hui-Hsin Hsieh
Vice President of Membership: Abby Aresty
Member-at-large: Eli Fieldsteel 
Treasurer: Margaret Schedel
Secretary: John Gibson 
Director of Communications: Mark Vaughn
Director of Recordings: Scott Miller
Director of Technical Development: Becky Brown
Diversity Officer: Elizabeth Hinkle-Turner
Editor, Journal SEAMUS: Drake Anderson
Editor, SEAMUS Newsletter: Jiayue Cecilia Wu
Immediate Past President: Ted Coffey

Conference and awards

In 1987, the society began giving the SEAMUS Award to acknowledge people who have made significant contributions to electro-acoustic music. The award is presented at the SEAMUS National Conference, held annually. SEAMUS has also, in cooperation with The University of Texas, established a national archive for electro-acoustic literature and compositions. The society also established EAMM (SEAMUS Electro-Acoustic Music Month) which is a worldwide celebration of electronic, computer and electroacoustic music which occurs in November of every year.

List of SEAMUS Award Winners

2022 Maggi Payne
2020 Annea Lockwood
2019 Gordon Mumma
2018 Scott A. Wyatt
2017 Carla Scaletti
2016 Pamela Z
2015 Dave Smith
2014 Barry Schrader
2013 Laurie Spiegel
2012 George Lewis
2011 Laurie Anderson
2010 Curtis Roads
2009 Larry Austin
2008 Miller Puckette
2007 Joel Chadabe
2006 Alvin Lucier
2005 Wendy Carlos
2004 Barry Vercoe
2003 Jon Appleton
2002 Don Buchla
2001 Herbert Brün
2000 Paul Lansky
1999 Pauline Oliveros
1998 Morton Subotnick
1997 Bebe and Louis Barron
1996 Charles Dodge
1995 Milton Babbitt
1994 Max Mathews
1993 John Chowning
1991 Robert Moog
1990 Otto Luening
1989 Mario Davidovsky
1988 Les Paul
1987 Vladimir Ussachevsky

Publications
Music from SEAMUS
Journal SEAMUS
SEAMUS Newsletter

Other international electroacoustic organisations
ACMA — Australasian Computer Music Association
CEC - Canadian Electroacoustic Community
CIME/ICEM — Confédération Internationale de Musique Electroacoustique / International Confederation of Electroacoustic Music
DeGeM — Deutsche Gesellschaft für Elektroakustische Musik e.V. (Germany)
DIEM — Danish Institute of Electroacoustic Music
EMS Network - Electroacoustic Music Studies Network
EMS — Elektroakustisk Musik i Sverige (Sweden)
EMSAN - Electroacoustic Music Studies Network Asia Network (France - East Asia)
ICMA — International Computer Music Association
HELMCA — Hellenic Electroacoustic Music Composers Association (Greece)
IRCAM — Institut de Recherche et Coordination Acoustique/Musique (France)
NEAR — Netherlands Electro-Acoustic Repertoire Centre
NOTAM — Norsk nettverk for Teknologi, Akustikk og Musikk
SAM — Sound and Music (UK)
60x60 — 60x60 produced by Vox Novus

See also
List of electronic music festivals

References

External links

Journal of the Society for American Music | Cambridge Core

Computer music
Electronic music organizations
Music organizations based in the United States
Classical music in the United States
Organizations established in 1984
Electronic music event management companies
Festival organizations in North America